Irmaos is a genus of crustaceans belonging to the monotypic family Irmaosidae.

The species of this genus are found in Seychelles.

Species:

Irmaos lobatus 
Irmaos sechellarum

References

Isopoda